Norman Evelyn Leslie, 19th Earl of Rothes (13 July 1877 – 29 March 1927) was a Scottish soldier and representative peer.

Background
Norman Leslie was the son of Martin Leslie Leslie (born Martin Leslie Haworth) and Georgina Frances , daughter of Henry , of Waddeton Court, Devon. Norman's paternal grandparents were Captain Martin Edward Haworth (d. 1886) and Mary Elizabeth Haworth-Leslie, 18th Countess of Rothes. Norman succeeded his grandmother to the earldom in 1893.

Military career
Lord Rothes was commissioned into a Militia battalion of the Devonshire Regiment in 1895. He was promoted Lieutenant in 1897 and resigned his commission in 1899. In 1905 he was appointed Captain in the Fife Royal Garrison Artillery, another Militia regiment. He resigned his commission in 1909. In 1911 he was appointed Lieutenant-Colonel commanding the Highland Cyclist Battalion, which was badged to the Black Watch.

The Earl of Rothes was elected a Scottish representative peer in 1906, a position he retained until 1923. He fought in the First World War and Leslie House, the ancestral family seat, became a hospital for the injured. His wife, Noëlle, Countess of Rothes, worked ceaselessly during the war, both at Leslie House and in London at the Coulter Hospital, serving as a Red Cross nurse. The earl was promoted to colonel in 1918. He sustained injuries during the war from which he never fully recovered. He sold Leslie House in 1919 and moved his family to England.

Family
Lord Rothes married Lucy Noël Martha Dyer-Edwardes, daughter of Thomas Dyer-Edwardes Jr. and Clementina Georgina Lucy Drummond Villiers, on 19 April 1900 in London. They had two children:

Malcolm George Dyer-Edwardes Leslie, 20th Earl of Rothes (8 February 1902–1975), married Beryl Violet Dugdale, daughter of Captain James Lionel Dugdale and Maud Violet Woodroffe, on 17 July 1926 and had issue.
The Honourable John Wayland Leslie (b. 1909–1991).

He died on 29 March 1927, aged 49, at their townhouse in Chelsea, London, and he was succeeded in the earldom by his eldest son, Malcolm.

References

1877 births
1927 deaths
19
Rothes, 19th Earl of
Royal Artillery officers
British Militia officers
Black Watch officers
Scottish representative peers
British Army personnel of World War I
British Army officers
Military personnel from London